Orbitals is the only studio album released by the alternative rock band Acroma. It was released in 2003 on Universal Records. The album was recorded at RadioStar Studios, in Weed, California.

Track listing
 Careless Ones (Intro) – 3:23
 Sun Rises Down – 4:12
 Sweat – 4:52
 Wash Away (Some Desert Night) – 4:39
 Don't Think Just Move – 5:17
 Motive – 5:12
 Perfect – 4:40
 Big Karma Now – 3:11
 Distance [hidden track] – 1:57
 Orbitals – 4:52
 On That Day – 3:53
 Slow Down – 3:21
 Take the Pain – 6:56

Personnel
Band

 Jeremy Stanley – vocals
 Brian Christensen – guitar
 Tom Collins – bass
 Joshua Zirbel – drums

Production

 Mike Fisher – electronic arrangements
 Sylvia Massy – production, mixing, mellotron
 Brian Sperber – mixing (tracks 1, 2, 4, and 7)
 Rich Veltrop – engineering
 Steve Walker – executive producer
 Paul McMenamin – art direction and design
 Matthew Welch – photography

References

External links
[ Allmusic]

2003 debut albums